Las Cruces ("the crosses") is the second-largest city in the U.S. state of New Mexico and the seat of Doña Ana County. As of the 2020 census the population was 111,385. Las Cruces is the largest city in both Doña Ana County and southern New Mexico. The Las Cruces metropolitan area had an estimated population of 213,849 in 2017. It is the principal city of a metropolitan statistical area which encompasses all of Doña Ana County and is part of the larger El Paso–Las Cruces combined statistical area.

Las Cruces is the economic and geographic center of the Mesilla Valley, the agricultural region on the floodplain of the Rio Grande which extends from Hatch to the west side of El Paso, Texas. Las Cruces is the home of New Mexico State University (NMSU), New Mexico's only land-grant university. The city's major employer is the federal government on nearby White Sands Test Facility and White Sands Missile Range. The Organ Mountains,  to the east, are dominant in the city's landscape, along with the Doña Ana Mountains, Robledo Mountains, and Picacho Peak.

The city is also the headquarters for Virgin Galactic, the world's first company to offer sub-orbital spaceflights.

History
During the Mexican–American War, the Battle of El Bracito was fought nearby on Christmas Day, 1846. The settlement of Las Cruces was founded in 1849 when the US Army first surveyed the town, thus opening up the area for American settlement. The town was first surveyed as the result of the American acquisition of the land surrounding Las Cruces, which later became the New Mexico Territory. This land had been ceded to the United States as a result of the Treaty of Guadalupe Hidalgo of 1848, which ended the Mexican American War. The town was named, "Las Cruces," after three crosses which were once located just north of the town.

Initially Mesilla became the leading settlement of the area, with more than 2,000 residents in 1860, more than twice what Las Cruces had; at that time, Mesilla had a population primarily of Mexican descent. When the Atchison, Topeka, and Santa Fe Railway reached the area, the landowners of Mesilla refused to sell it the rights-of-way, and instead residents of Las Cruces donated the rights-of-way and land for a depot in Las Cruces. The first train reached Las Cruces in 1881. Las Cruces was not affected as strongly by the train as some other villages, as it was not a terminus or a crossroads, but the population did grow to 2,300 in the 1880s. Las Cruces was incorporated as a town in 1907.

Pat Garrett is best known for his involvement in the Lincoln County War, but he also worked in Las Cruces on a famous case, the disappearance of Albert Jennings Fountain in 1896.

New Mexico State University was founded in 1888, and it has grown as Las Cruces has grown. Growth of Las Cruces has been attributed to the university, government jobs, and recent retirees. The establishment of White Sands Missile Range in 1944 and White Sands Test Facility in 1963 has been integral to population growth. Las Cruces is the nearest city to each, and they provide Las Cruces' work force many high-paying, stable, government jobs. In recent years, the influx of retirees from out of state has also increased Las Cruces' population.

In the 1960s Las Cruces undertook a large urban renewal project, intended to convert the old downtown into a modern city center. As part of this, St. Genevieve's Catholic Church, built in 1859, was razed to make way for a downtown pedestrian mall. The original covered walkways have  been removed in favor of a more traditional main street thoroughfare.

On February 10, 1990, seven people were shot, four fatally, in the Las Cruces bowling alley massacre.  The incident remains unsolved.

Geography

Las Cruces is the center of the Organ Caldera; the Doña Ana Mountains to the north and the Organ Mountains to the east are its margins. Its major eruption was 32 Ma.

Doña Ana County lies within the Chihuahuan Desert ecoregion, and the vegetation surrounding the built portions of the city are typical of this setting; it includes creosote bush (Larrea tridentata), soaptree (Yucca elata), tarbush (Flourensia cernua), broom dalea (Psorothamnus scoparius), and various desert grasses such as tobosa (Hilaria mutica or Pleuraphis mutica) and black grama (Bouteloua eriopoda).

The Rio Grande bisects the Mesilla Valley and passes west of Las Cruces proper, supplying irrigation water for the intensive agriculture surrounding the city. However, since the institution of water rights, the Rio Grande fills its banks only when water is released from upstream dams, which before 2020 usually occurred at least from March to September. Drought conditions, exacerbated by climate change, mean that the Rio Grande experiences increasingly short or small flows.

Prior to farming and ranching, desert shrub vegetation extended into the valley from the adjacent deserts, including extensive stands of tornillo (Prosopis pubescens) and catclaw acacia (Acacia greggii). Desert grasslands extend in large part between the edges of Las Cruces and the lower slopes of the nearby Organ and Robledo Mountains, where grasses and assorted shrubs and cacti dominate large areas of this mostly rangeland as well as the occasional large-lot subdivision housing.

The desert and desert grassland uplands surrounding both sides of the Mesilla Valley are often dissected with arroyos, dry streams that often carry water following heavy thunderstorms. These arroyos often contain scattered small trees, and they serve as wildlife corridors between Las Cruces' urban areas and adjacent deserts or mountains.

Layout

Unlike many cities its size, Las Cruces lacks a true central business district. This is because in the 1960s an urban-renewal project tore down a large part of the original downtown. Many chain stores and national restaurants are located in the rapidly developing east side. Las Cruces' shopping mall and a variety of retail stores and restaurants are located in this area.

However, the historic downtown of the city is the area around Main Street, a six-block stretch of which was closed off in 1973 to form a pedestrianized shopping area. The downtown mall has an extensive farmers market each Wednesday and Saturday morning, where a variety of foods and cultural items can be purchased from numerous small stands that are set up by local farmers, artists and craftspeople. This area also contains museums, businesses, restaurants, churches, art galleries and theaters, which add a great deal to the changing character of Las Cruces' historic downtown.

In August 2005, a master plan was adopted, the centerpiece of which was the restoration of narrow lanes of two-way traffic on this model portion of Main Street. Main Street was reopened to vehicular traffic in 2012.

In February 2013, Las Cruces Mayor Ken Miyagishima announced during his "State of the City" address that a  park in the area behind the Las Cruces Dam was under construction, in cooperation with the Army Corps of Engineers. The area features trails through restored wetlands and serves as a major refuge for migratory birds and a key recreational area for the city.

Climate
Las Cruces has a desert climate (Köppen BWk). Winters alternate between colder and windier weather following trough and frontal passages, and warmer, sunnier periods; light freezes occur 69 nights on average. Spring months can be windy, particularly in the afternoons, sometimes causing periods of blowing dust and short-lived dust storms. Summers begin with the hottest weather of the year, with some extended periods of over  temperatures not uncommon, while the latter half of the summer sees increased humidity and frequent afternoon thunderstorms, with slightly lower daytime temperatures. Autumns feature decreasing temperatures and decreasing precipitation.

Precipitation is very light from October to June, with only occasional winter storm systems bringing any precipitation to the Las Cruces area. Most winter moisture is in the form of rain, though some light snowfalls happen most winters, usually enough to accumulate and stay on the ground for a few hours. Summer precipitation is often from heavy thunderstorms, especially from the late summer monsoon weather pattern.

Since records began in 1892, the lowest temperature recorded at New Mexico State University has been  on January 11, 1962 – though only ten nights have ever fallen to or below  – and the highest  on June 28, 1994.

Demographics

Census 2020 data and 2019 estimates 
As of the 2020 census Las Cruces had a population of 111,385.

Estimates for 2019 say that Las Cruces had a population of 103,432. Its demographics were 32.5% Non-Hispanic White, 2.8% African American or Black, 1.4% Native American, 1.8% Asian, 0.0% Native Hawaiian or Pacific Islander, 2.9% Two or more races, 60.5% Hispanic or Latino of any race. There were 39,925 households with an average household size of 2.51 people per household. Median household income was $43,022, and the percentage of people in poverty was 23.6%.

Census 2010 data 
As of the 2010 census Las Cruces had a population of 97,618. The ethnic and racial makeup of the population was:
 56.8% Hispanic and Latino Americans (Hispanics may be of any race)
 34.3% Non-Hispanic White
 2.4% African American or Black
 1.7% Native Americans
 1.6% Asian
 0.1% Native Hawaiian and Other Pacific Islander
 3.5% Two or more races

Census 2000 data

As of the census of 2000, there were 74,267 people, 29,184 households, and 18,123 families residing in the city. The population density was 1,425.7 people per square mile (550.5/km2). There were 31,682 housing units at an average density of 608.2 per square mile (234.8/km2). The racial makeup of the city was 69.0% White, 2.3% African American, 1.7% Native American, 1.2% Asian, 0.1% Pacific Islander, 21.6% from other races, and 4.1% from two or more races. Hispanic or Latino of any race were 51.7% of the population.

There were 29,184 households, out of which 30.4% had children under the age of 18 living with them, 42.3% were married couples living together, 15.1% had a female householder with no husband present, and 37.9% were non-families. 27.9% of all households were made up of individuals, and 8.9% had someone living alone who was 65 years of age or older. The average household size was 2.46 and the average family size was 3.05.

In the city, the population was spread out, with 25.1% under the age of 18, 16.0% from 18 to 24, 26.9% from 25 to 44, 19.0% from 45 to 64, and 13.1% who were 65 years of age or older. The median age was 31 years. For every 100 females, there were 94.3 males. For every 100 females age 18 and over, there were 91.0 males.

The median income for a household in the city was $30,375, and the median income for a family was $37,670. Males had a median income of $30,923 versus $21,759 for females. The per capita income for the city was $15,704. About 17.2% of families and 23.3% of the population were below the poverty line, including 30.7% of those under age 18 and 9.7% of those age 65 or over.

Economy
Major employers in Las Cruces are New Mexico State University, Las Cruces Public Schools, the City of Las Cruces, Memorial Medical Center, Walmart, MountainView Regional Medical Center, Doña Ana County, Doña Ana Community College, Addus HealthCare, and NASA.

Film and television shoots
Movies and TV series shot in Las Cruces include:
 The 2018 film, The Mule, written, produced, directed by, and starring Clint Eastwood, filmed for 6 days in and around Las Cruces.
 The 1964 pilot, Calhoun: County Agent, starring Jackie Cooper and Barbara Stanwyck, was filmed in and around Las Cruces, but never aired. The process of writing and shooting the pilot is the subject of Merle Miller and Evan Rhodes's book Only You, Dick Daring!

Arts and culture

Annual events
Most of Las Cruces's cultural events are held late in the calendar year.

The city hosts two wine festivals annually. The Harvest Wine Festival is held over Labor Day weekend, and features wines from New Mexico wineries, a grape stomping contest, several concerts throughout the weekend, food from several local vendors, and related shopping. The Southern New Mexico Wine Festival is held over Memorial Day weekend and also exclusively features New Mexico wines, local foods, and live music. Additionally, the Southern New Mexico Wine Festival features the University of Wine, short educational sessions which teach patrons about proper food and wine pairings. Both festivals are held at the fairgrounds just west of the city.

The local Day of the Dead (Día de los Muertos) originated in Mexico, and is a celebration of the lives of those now dead. It is held November 1–2 by the Calavera Coalition, a nonprofit organization. The event is held at the plaza in Mesilla, and at the Branigan Cultural Center in downtown Las Cruces.

Every year in October, Las Cruces holds a pumpkin harvest festival in Mesilla for the whole month of October. On Halloween, the Mesilla Valley Mall holds a "day of the walking dead", where zombies walk around the mall.

The Renaissance ArtsFaire, founded in 1971, includes a juried art show and is put on by the Doña Ana Arts Council each year in November. It is held at Young Park.

Cowboy Days is an event held in Las Cruces at the Farm and Ranch Heritage Museum. It is one of the largest events at the museum, and it is held over two days in early March. Some of the fun includes "children's activities, cowboy food and music, cowboy mounted shooting, horseback and stagecoach rides, living history, gunfight re-enactments, arts and crafts vendors, roping, horseshoeing and many other demonstrations."

A Cinco de Mayo celebration is held May 3–4. Cinco de Mayo ("Fifth of May") is the celebration of Mexican heritage and pride. The event is held in Mesilla and provides arts and crafts, food vendors, and Mexican music.

Another major event is the annual 4th of July Electric Light Parade, celebration and fireworks display held July 3 and 4. The celebration begins with a parade and ends with a fireworks display held at the Field of Dreams Football Stadium.

The Las Cruces Game Convention, now known as CrucesCon, is an annual event where gamers compete in high-level tournaments and play free games. The LCGC is a non-profit event with 100% of the proceeds going towards the community, equipment, and future events.

The Southern New Mexico State Fair, usually held the first week in October at the fairgrounds west of Las Cruces, promotes traditional agriculture. Boasting one of the largest junior livestock shows in the state, the fair invites youth from six counties in New Mexico and Texas to participate.

One last major event held annually in the Las Cruces area is the lighting of the Mesilla Plaza. Every Christmas Eve, the historic plaza of Mesilla is lined with thousands of luminarias, which are brown bags containing candles and weighted with sand. The evening consistently attracts locals and tourists.

The Whole Enchilada Fiesta was held the last weekend in September. It attracted roughly 50,000 attendees each year. The centerpiece was the making of a large flat enchilada. The fiesta started in 1980 with a  enchilada, and it grew over the years. In 2000, the fiesta's  enchilada was certified by Guinness World Records as the world's largest. After the enchilada was assembled, it was cut into many pieces and distributed free of charge to the fiesta attendees. The enchilada was the brainchild of local restaurant owner Roberto V. Estrada, who directed its preparation each year. The celebration also featured a parade, the Whole Enchilada Fiesta Queen competition, a huachas tournament, activities for kids, live music, an enchilada eating contest, a 5 kilometer road race, a one-mile race, and a car and motorcycle show. After 34 years, The Whole Enchilada Fiesta's final event occurred in 2014 after Estrada had retired.

The annual Border Book Festival once featured a trade show, readings, film festival, workshops led by local artists and writers, and discussion panels that ended its 20-year run in April 2015. The festival was founded in 1994 by authors Denise Chávez and Susan Tweit; Chávez was the executive director of the festival.

Venues

Museums

The New Mexico Farm and Ranch Heritage Museum is state-operated and shows the history of farming and ranching in New Mexico. It is located just east of New Mexico State University.

The New Mexico State University Arthropod Museum and Collection contains approximately 500,000 arthropod specimens.
The University Museum (Kent Hall) at New Mexico State University focuses on archeological and ethnographic collections and also has some history and natural science collections.

The Zuhl Museum (located in the Alumni and Visitors' Center) at New Mexico State University focuses on geologic collections, including the finest collection of petrified wood on display and a large fossil and mineral collection.

There are four city-owned museums. The Branigan Cultural Center examines local history through photographs, sculpture, paintings, and poetry. The building is on the National Register of Historic Places. The Las Cruces Museum of Art offers art exhibits and classes. The Las Cruces Museum of Natural History makes science and natural history more accessible to the general public and has an emphasis on local animals and plants. The Las Cruces Railroad Museum is in the historic Santa Fe Railroad station. It exhibits the impact of the railroads on the local area.

Symphony
The Las Cruces Symphony Orchestra is an 80-member orchestra, conducted by Dr. Ming Luke. The orchestra consists of 47% students, 17% NMSU faculty, 20% other local musicians, and 16% professionals from outside Las Cruces. The venue of the orchestra is the NMSU Music Center Recital Hall. The orchestra received attention with the world premiere of Bill McGlaughlin's Remembering Icarus, a tribute to local radio pioneer Ralph Willis Goddard, performed by the LCSO on October 1, 2005.
The performance was taped and broadcast nationally on NPR's Performance Today on December 9, 2005
and on July 4, 2007, on Performance Today and on Sirius Satellite Radio.

Other points of interest
Several water tanks in Las Cruces have been painted with murals by Tony Pennock, including one at the intersection of Triviz Drive and Griggs Avenue.
Multimedia artist group Keep Adding have a large mural titled Wave Nest on Picacho Avenue at the Lion's Park.

The Cathedral of the Immaculate Heart of Mary is the mother church of the Roman Catholic Diocese of Las Cruces.

Sports

Las Cruses is the home of Valdo Speedway, a 3/8ths of a mile dirt track that host the annual Wild West Shootout.

At the university level, the New Mexico State Aggies compete in the Western Athletic Conference for men's and women's basketball, and as an independent team for football. Aggies men's basketball has had a rich history of success. Between 2010 and 2019, the Aggies made the NCAA tournament eight times. The team also reached the Final Four of the tournament in 1970. The 2014-15 NMSU women's basketball team reached the NCAA tournament for the first time since 1988, when it won both the WAC regular season and tournament championships.

The Las Cruces Kings have been a long running semi-professional football team in the city.

Beginning in the 2010 season, the Las Cruces Vaqueros were the first ever professional sports team in Las Cruces. In the 2011 season the Vaqueros joined the Pecos League of Professional Baseball Clubs against the White Sands Pupfish, Roswell Invaders, Ruidoso Osos, Alpine Cowboys and Carlsbad Bats. The Vaqueros played in the Pecos League of Professional Baseball Clubs for the 2011–2013 seasons. The team returned for the 2015 season, but structural damage to their home ballpark in January 2016 forced them to sit out the 2016 season. They plan to return for the 2017 season.

Parks and recreation

Las Cruces operates 87 city parks, 18 tennis courts, and four golf courses.
A list of parks, with facilities and maps, is available.

Las Cruces holds a Ciclovía, a citywide event featuring exercise and physical activities, on the last Sunday of each month at Meerscheidt Recreation Center.

Government

Las Cruces is a charter city (also called a home rule city) and has a council–manager form of government. The city council consists of six councillors and the mayor, who chairs the meetings. The mayor is elected at-large, and each of the city councilors represents one neighborhood district within the city. Each resident of Las Cruces is thus represented by the mayor and by one city councilor. The mayor and city council members serve staggered four-year terms. As of the 2017–2019 term, the mayor is Ken Miyagishima. Councilors are Kasandra Gandara, Dist. 1, Mayor Pro Tem; Tessa Abeyta-Stuve, Dist. 2; Gabriel Vasquez, Dist. 3; Johana Bencomo, Dist. 4; Gill M. Sorg, Dist. 5; Yvonne Flores, Dist. 6. Live and archived video of city council meetings are available anytime at   Las Cruces, NM.
In the November 2019 municipal election, Ranked Choice Voting was used for the first time.

Education

Public schools
Public schools are in the Las Cruces Public School District, which covers the city of Las Cruces as well as White Sands Missile Range, the settlement of Doña Ana, and the town of Mesilla. The system has 26 elementary schools, nine middle schools, and six high schools. Of the high schools, Rio Grande Preparatory is an alternative high school.

There are four charter schools within the Las Cruces Public Schools. Alma d'arte is a high school with a focus on an integrated arts curriculum. Las Montañas is a charter high school that opened in fall 2007 and caters to at-risk students. New America High School offers schooling for young and older adults who want to go back to school for their diploma or GED. Academia Dolores Huerta Middle School is the only recognized dual language program in the state.

New Mexico School for the Deaf operates a preschool facility in Las Cruces.

High schools

 Arrowhead Park Early College High School
 Centennial High School
 Las Cruces High School
 Mayfield High School
 Organ Mountain High School
 Alma d'arte Charter High School

Private schools
There are five private Christian schools in Las Cruces. College Heights Kindergarten is a private Christian kindergarten, founded in 1954. Desert Springs Christian Academy, Las Cruces Catholic School, Mesilla Valley Christian School, and a small independent Baptist school called Cornerstone Christian Academy are other Christian schools in the area.

A secular non-profit private school, Las Cruces Academy offers grades K-5 with plans to eventually enroll grades K–12.

Colleges and universities

University

New Mexico State University, or NMSU, is a land-grant university that has its main campus in Las Cruces. The school was founded in 1888 as Las Cruces College, an agricultural college, and in 1889 the school became New Mexico College of Agriculture and Mechanic Arts. It received its present name, New Mexico State University, in 1960. The NMSU Las Cruces campus had approximately 18,500 students enrolled as of fall 2012, and had a faculty-to-student ratio of about 1 to 19. NMSU offers a wide range of programs and awards associate, bachelor's, master's, and doctoral degrees through its main campus and four community colleges. For 10 consecutive years, NMSU has been rated as one of America's 100 Best College Buys for offering "the very highest quality education at the lowest cost" by Institutional Research & Evaluation Inc., an independent research and consulting organization for higher education. NMSU is one of only two land-grant institutions classified as Hispanic-serving by the federal government. The university is home to New Mexico's NASA Space Grant Program and is one of 52 institutions in the United States to be designated a Space Grant College. During its most recent review by NASA, NMSU was one of only 12 space grant programs in the country to receive an excellent rating.

The Burrell College of Osteopathic Medicine (BCOM), a private osteopathic medical school, opened on the campus of NMSU in 2013. The first class began instruction in August 2016.

Two-year
Doña Ana Community College is a branch of New Mexico State University. When it first opened in 1973, it had 500 students in six programs. In the 2015–2016 school year, there were 4,997 full-time equivalent credit enrollments and 4,246 non-credit students, served by 136 full-time faculty, 401 part-time instructors, together with 225 full-time staff and 55 part-time staff.

DACC operates centers in Anthony, Sunland Park, Chaparral, and White Sands Missile Range. In Las Cruces, its central campus is at 3400 S. Espina Street, and its East Mesa campus is at 2800 Sonoma Ranch Boulevard. Community Education is available at all centers and campuses and also in Las Cruces at the Mesquite Neighborhood Learning Center at 804 N. Tornillo, and Workforce Center at 2345 E. Nevada Street.

Libraries

Thomas Branigan Memorial Library is the city's public library. It was constructed in 1979
and has a collection of about 185,000 items.
The previous library building, also called Thomas Branigan Memorial Library, opened in 1935. That building is now the Branigan Cultural Center. and is on the National Register of Historic Places.

The two university libraries at the New Mexico State University campus, Branson Library and Zuhl Library, are open to the public. Any New Mexico resident can check out items from these libraries.

Media
Las Cruces is part of the El Paso – Las Cruces Designated Market Area (DMA) as defined by Nielsen Media Research. The City of Las Cruces operates CLC-TV cable channel 20, an Emmy award-winning 24-hour Government-access television (GATV) and Educational-access television channel on Comcast cable TV in Las Cruces. CLC-TV televises live and recorded Las Cruces city council meetings, Doña Ana County commission meetings and Las Cruces School board meetings. The channel also televises City Beat, a monthly news magazine, hosted by Jennifer Martinez, with information directly related to the City of Las Cruces. Also available for viewing is health news and other government/education related programming, as well as current weather reports and road and traffic information. CLC-TV is not a Public-access television cable TV channel. In addition to a 2009 Emmy Award by the Rocky Mountain Southwest Chapter of the National Academy of Television Arts and Sciences, CLC-TV received a 1st and 3rd place award by the National Association of Telecommunications Officers and Advisors (NATOA) and five national Telly Awards, four platinum and one gold.

Las Cruces Sun-News is a daily newspaper published in Las Cruces by Digital First Media. Las Cruces Bulletin is a weekly community newspaper published in Las Cruces by FIG Publications, LLC. It is tabloid size and covers local news, business, arts, sports, and homes. The Round Up is the student newspaper at New Mexico State University. It is tabloid size and published twice weekly. The Ink is a monthly tabloid published in Las Cruces, covering the arts and community events in southern New Mexico and west Texas.

Las Cruces has one television station, the PBS outlet KRWG-TV, operated by New Mexico State University. The Telemundo outlet KTDO is licensed in Las Cruces but serves El Paso. The city also receives several Albuquerque, El Paso, and Ciudad Juárez stations. Las Cruces is in Nielsen Media Research's El Paso/Las Cruces television media market.

Las Cruces has one local commercial independent cable television station called "The Las Cruces Channel" (LCC98). It can be seen on Comcast cable channel 98. LCC-98 is not a Public-access television channel. The channel airs programs that are produced locally in their studio facility and by outside producers.

There are approximately ten commercial radio stations in the Las Cruces area, running a variety of formats. Four of these stations are owned by Adams Radio Group and four are owned by Bravo Mic Communications, LLC, a Las Cruces company. The local NPR outlet is KRWG-FM, operated by New Mexico State University. NMSU also operates a college radio station, KRUX. KRUC is a Spanish-language station in Las Cruces. Many El Paso stations are received in Las Cruces. See list of radio stations in New Mexico for a complete list of stations. Las Cruces is in Arbitron's Las Cruces media market.

Infrastructure

Transportation

Airports
 Las Cruces International Airport – No current regularly scheduled commercial passenger flights since July 25, 2005, when Westward Airways ceased operations. General aviation, New Mexico Army National Guard (4 UH-72 Lakota Helicopters), private charters and CAP use the airport, among others.
 El Paso International Airport – Nearest airport with regularly scheduled commercial flights.

Major highways
 Interstate 10, east–west travel: south-southeast to El Paso, Texas; west to Tucson, Arizona.
 Interstate 25, north–south travel: north to Albuquerque. Las Cruces is the southern terminus for Interstate 25 where it intersects Interstate 10.
 U.S. Route 70, east–west travel: northeast to Alamogordo; to the west it is merged with Interstate 10.
 U.S. Route 180

Rail
Las Cruces is served by the Burlington Northern Santa Fe Railway, via a branch line that extends from Belen, New Mexico to El Paso, Texas. Passenger service on this line was discontinued in 1968, due to low ridership numbers on the Atchison, Topeka, and Santa Fe Railway's (predecessor to the BNSF) El Pasoan train.

Bus transit
The city operates a small transit authority known as RoadRUNNER Transit. RoadRUNNER Transit operates a total of eight routes, and two Aggie routes running Mondays through Saturdays. There is no Sunday service. An adult fare (ages 19–59) is $1.00. Youth (ages 6–18), senior citizens (60+), people with disabilities, medicare holders, and students pay $0.50. Children age 5 and younger do not pay.

NMDOT Park and Ride's Gold Route connects Las Cruces to El Paso, Texas Monday through Friday during commute hours. The Silver Route connects Las Cruces to White Sands Missile Range. The fare for this service is $3.00.

Ztrans connects Las Cruces with Alamogordo.

Greyhound's Las Cruces stop is located in the nearby unincorporated community of Doña Ana. Buses departing Las Cruces serve El Paso, Amarillo, Denver, Albuquerque, Phoenix, Tucson, Los Angeles, and San Diego.

Utilities
The city of Las Cruces provides water, sewer, natural gas, and solid waste services, including recycling centers. El Paso Electric is the electricity provider, CenturyLink is the telephone land line provider, and Comcast is the cable TV provider.

Healthcare

Hospitals
Memorial Medical Center is a for-profit general hospital operated by LifePoint Hospitals Inc. The physical plant is owned by the City of Las Cruces and the County of Doña Ana, who signed a 40-year, $150 million lease in 2004 with Province HealthCare, since absorbed into LifePoint.
Prior to 2004 it was leased to and operated by the nonprofit Memorial Medical Center Inc.
The hospital is a licensed 286-bed acute care facility and is accredited by JCAHO. It offers a wide range of patient services.
The University of New Mexico Cancer Center-South opened in 2006 on the MMC campus.

The original facility was called Memorial General Hospital and was opened in April 1950 at South Alameda Boulevard and Lohman Avenue after the city obtained a $250,000 federal grant. In 1971 the city and county joined to build a new hospital on South Telshor Boulevard. In 1990 it was renamed Memorial Medical Center.

MountainView Regional Medical Center is a for-profit general hospital operated by Community Health Systems (formerly Triad Hospitals). It opened for business in August 2002. It is a 168-bed facility with a wide range of patient services.

Mesilla Valley Hospital is a 125-bed private psychiatric hospital operated by Universal Health Services. It is an acute inpatient and residential facility offering a variety of treatments for behavioral health issues.

Rehabilitation Hospital of Southern New Mexico is a 40-bed rehabilitative care hospital, operated by Ernest Health Inc. It opened January 2005. It treats patients after they have been cared for at general hospitals for injuries or strokes.

Advanced Care Hospital of Southern New Mexico is a 20-bed long-term acute care facility operated by Ernest Health Inc. It opened in July 2007.

Notable people

 Richard Artschwager, painter and sculptor, grew up in Las Cruces
 Anwar al-Awlaki, Alleged Al-Qaeda spokesman and regional leader, born in Las Cruces; killed by the U.S. government in 2011 for his alleged propaganda on behalf of Al-Qaeda in the Arabian Peninsula
 Barnard Elliott Bee, Jr., career U.S. Army officer and a Confederate States Army general during the American Civil War; spent six years in Las Cruces prior to the war
 Rich Beem, professional golfer who played high school and college golf at Las Cruces High School and New Mexico State University; winner of the 2002 PGA Championship
 Joseph Benavidez, Mexican-American mixed martial arts fighter
 Baxter Black, cowboy, poet, philosopher, former large-animal veterinarian, and radio commentator, who grew up in Las Cruces and attended New Mexico State University
 Frank Borman, NASA astronaut and engineer, has a home and auto dealership in Las Cruces. Known for Gemini VII, a nearly 14 day low Earth orbital mission (1965) and Apollo 8, the first humans to leave low Earth orbit, reach and orbit the Moon, and return safely (1968)
 William Bowers, Oscar-nominated screenwriter, born in Las Cruces
 Randy Brown, professional basketball player for the Chicago Bulls while winning three NBA titles during 1996–98; previously played at New Mexico State University
 Pamela Burford, novelist, born in Las Cruces
 Edgar Castillo, Mexican-American association football player
 Denise Chávez, author, playwright, and stage director
 Steve Colter, professional basketball player in the NBA, played at New Mexico State University
 John A.D. Cooper, physician and educator, first president of the Association of American Medical Colleges, grew up in Las Cruces
 Sharon Douglas, actress, attended Las Cruces Union High School
 Doug Eddings, Major League umpire, lives in Las Cruces
 Albert Fall, U.S. Senator from New Mexico and U.S. Secretary of the Interior
 Richard Farrer, South African–American soccer player, grew up in Las Cruces
 Albert Jennings Fountain, lawyer, Indian fighter, and Republican politician in Texas and New Mexico whose disappearance remains a mystery
 Chuck Franco, First Gentleman of New Mexico
 Pat Garrett, Old West lawman who killed Billy the Kid
 Mimi Reisel Gladstein, professor of English and Theatre Arts at the University of Texas at El Paso, specialist on authors Ayn Rand and John Steinbeck
 Lou Henson, basketball coach who coached New Mexico State University and University of Illinois teams to the Final Four
 Po James, running back who played four seasons for NFL's Philadelphia Eagles; played collegiately at New Mexico State University
 Charley Johnson, NFL quarterback, professor of chemical engineering at his alma mater, New Mexico State University, resides in Las Cruces
 Albert Johnson, first black mayor in New Mexico
 Paul Wilbur Klipsch, engineer and high fidelity audio pioneer, known for developing the high-efficiency folded horn loudspeaker; graduated from New Mexico State University
 Timothy Kraft, political consultant, 1980 campaign manager for Jimmy Carter, retired in Las Cruces
 Kiki Lara, soccer player, born in Las Cruces
 Delano Lewis, U.S. Ambassador to South Africa, president and CEO of National Public Radio, resides in Las Cruces
 Kerry Locklin, football coach, most recently defensive line coach for NFL's New York Jets
 Mireille Marokvia, French writer best known for two books about her ordeals during World War II in Nazi Germany; lived in Las Cruces later in life until her death in 2008
 Mark Medoff, Tony Award-winning playwright of Children of a Lesser God
 Rose Marie Pangborn, scientist, pioneer in the sensory analysis of food, born in Las Cruces
 Bertha M. Paxton, first woman elected to the New Mexico Legislature
 Lenny Pickett, the saxophonist and musical director of the Saturday Night Live band was born in Las Cruces
 Buck Pierce, professional Canadian football quarterback who played for New Mexico State University; lives in Las Cruces during the off-season
 Bashir Ramzy, long jumper in track and field, won a bronze medal in the 2007 Pan American Games; born in Las Cruces
 Patricia Ryan, writer of romance, mystery and erotic novels; born in Las Cruces
 Dante Caro, Las Cruces High Graduate, D1 King
 Mai Shanley, Miss USA 1984
 Tom Smith, playwright and director, teaches at New Mexico State University, resides in Las Cruces
 Clyde Tombaugh, astronomer, discovered Pluto, lived in Las Cruces until his death in 1997
 Austin Trout, former WBA light-middleweight champion of the world, was born and fights out of Las Cruces
 Prentiss Walker, member of the United States House of Representatives from Mississippi, lived part of his childhood in Las Cruces
 Cora Witherspoon, stage and screen character actress, Las Cruces resident along with her sister, Maud Witherspoon
 Fredd Young, four-time Pro Bowl football player for the Seattle Seahawks and the Indianapolis Colts; played for New Mexico State, lives in Las Cruces

See also
 Las Cruces Police Department

Sister cities

  Ciudad Lerdo, Durango, Mexico
  Nienburg, Lower Saxony, Germany

Las Cruces Sister Cities Foundation is responsible for overseeing sister cities activities on behalf of the citizens of Las Cruces. The Foundation was created in 1989 to officially recognize a relationship that began in 1982 with exchanges between Dona Ana Community College and the Centro de Bachilleratio Technológico Industrial y de Servicios Numero 4 of Lerdo, Durango, Mexico.

References

External links

 City of Las Cruces official website
 Las Cruces Convention and Visitors Bureau
 

 
Cities in Doña Ana County, New Mexico
County seats in New Mexico
New Mexico populated places on the Rio Grande
Cities in New Mexico